Nikolaos Patsiavouras (born 29 May 1958 in Larissa, Greece) is a former football defender.

Patsiavouras finished his playing career with Aris Thessaloniki F.C. in the 1989–90 season.

He made one appearance for the Greece national football team.

References

1958 births
Living people
Footballers from Larissa
Athlitiki Enosi Larissa F.C. players
Greek footballers
Greece international footballers
Aris Thessaloniki F.C. players
Panathinaikos F.C. players
Association football defenders